The Cornhusker Army Ammunition Plant was built by the US army beginning in 1942 to produce munitions during World War II.
The plant produced munitions during World War II, the Korean War, and the Vietnam War. 
It is currently an EPA Superfund site because of groundwater contamination by explosives and soil contamination by explosives and heavy metals.
The plant occupies .

Facilities
The facility included production areas (where munitions were loaded, assembled, and packed), a fertilizer manufacturer, storage facilities, sanitary landfill, and burning grounds where materials contaminated with explosives were ignited.
Explosives produced or used included TNT, RDX and HMX.

Nuclear war contingency plan
In the event of nuclear war between the US and the USSR, the Cornhusker plant would have been used as an alternative command and control location for Strategic Air Command forces, with the Headquarters Emergency Relocation Team deploying there from Offutt Air Force Base.

Superfund status
The site was proposed as a superfund site in October 1984 and listed in July 1987.
The USACE/Army is currently conducting the first stage of cleanup activities.

See also
List of Superfund sites in Nebraska

References

External links

United States Army arsenals
Historic American Engineering Record in Nebraska
Military installations in Nebraska
Military Superfund sites
United States Army arsenals during World War II
Superfund sites in Nebraska
1942 establishments in Nebraska